The following is a list of flags related with Rwanda.

National flag

Government flag

Ethnic group flag

Political party flags

Historical flags

See also 

 Flag of Rwanda
 Seal of Rwanda

References 

Lists and galleries of flags
Flags